The Very Best of Collette and Sharon O'Neill is a combined compilation album from New Zealand born, Australian pop singers Collette and Sharon O'Neill.
It was Collette's first compilation album and O'Neill's second. The album was released on CBS Records' budget label J&B. The album received little promotion and was a commercial failure, failing to chart.

The album was notable as it included the O'Neill track "Power", marking the first time it was included on an album.

Track listing
CD/Cassette (JB477CD)

 "Upside Down"	
 "Who Do You Think You Are"	
 "Ring My Bell"	
 "That's What I Like About You"
 "Victim of the Groove"
 "Push"	
 "Hothouse"	
 "Only You Can Do It"	
 "Danger"	
 "Maxine"
 "Losing You"	
 "Waiting for You"	
 "Asian Paradise"	
 "For All the Tea in China"	
 "Words"
 "Power"

Note
Tracks 1–8 are performed by Collette. Tracks 9–16 are performed by Sharon O'Neill.

References

1992 compilation albums
Compilation albums by Australian artists
Sharon O'Neill albums
Collette Roberts albums